Four Essays for Orchestra (Cztery Eseje) is an orchestral composition by Polish composer Tadeusz Baird written in 1958. It was prized in the 1959 UNESCO Rostrum of Composers, the first of three works by Baird to attain this distinction, and it also won the Grzegorz Fitelberg Competition. Each of the four movements is scored for different instrumental combinations, and they are marked as follows:

 Molto adagio
 Allegretto grazioso
 Allegro
 Molto adagio (improvvisando e rubato)

Discography
 Warsaw Philharmonic – Witold Rowicki. Muza (later reissued by Philips).

References

Compositions by Tadeusz Baird
1958 compositions